Cedrik-Marcel Stebe was the defending champion but chose not to defend his title.

Jozef Kovalík won the title after defeating Arthur De Greef 6–4, 6–0 in the final.

Seeds

Draw

Finals

Top half

Bottom half

References
Main Draw
Qualifying Draw

Poprad-Tatry ATP Challenger Tour - Singles
2018 Singles